Jebel Ali Free Zone (Jafza; Arabic: (جافزا) المنطقة الحرّة لجبل علي al-Munṭaqa al-Ḥurra le Jabal ʿAlī) is a free economic zone located in the Jebel Ali area at the far western end of Dubai, United Arab Emirates, near Abu Dhabi.  Jebel Ali Free Zone (Jafza) is the flagship free zone of DP World, and is an integral part of the DP World UAE’s integrated business hub. Created under a Ruler's Decree, Jafza commenced operations in 1985 with only 19 companies offering standard size office units and warehouses to provide ready built facilities to customers. In 1990 Jafza expanded its facilities to include light industrial units.

As of 2021, Jebel Ali Free Zone (Jafza) hosts over 8,700 companies and is considered the world's largest free zone.

Location 
Jebel Ali Free Zone (Jafza) is spread over 57 square k.m located in the Jebel Ali area at the far western end of Dubai, on the Skeikh Zayed Road (E11) and is accessible from Mohammed Bin Zayed Road (E311) too.

 Jafza is located at 24’59’05.22 N, 55’05’26.45 E (24.984786, 55.0906813).
 The closest gate to access Jebel Ali Free Zone (Jafza) is Gate 4 of Jebel Ali. Access to the free zone is restricted and requires a Gate Pass. Obtaining a gate pass requires prior registration. 
 Jafza is located alongside the region’s largest deep sea port in Jebel Ali. It is adjacent to the Dubai Expo 2020 site.
 Jafza is located 40 k.m from Dubai International Airport and 24 k.m from Al Maktoum International Airport.

Economy

More than 8,700 global companies are based in Jafza. This includes approximately 100 of the Fortune Global 500 companies including aerospace giant Liebherr through its subsidiary OEMServices. Jafza accounts for almost 32 per cent of total FDI (Foreign Direct Investment) flow into the country. The free zone contributes 21 per cent of Dubai's GDP on a yearly basis and it sustains the employment of more than 144,000 people in the United Arab Emirates. In 2015, Jafza generated trade worth $87.6 billion.

References

External links 

Satellite image of New West Camp Jebel Ali Free Zone.

Free-trade zones of the United Arab Emirates
Economy of Dubai
Geography of Dubai
Neighbourhoods in the United Arab Emirates
DP World